Pomatonota is a monotypic genus of katydids; the sole species is Pomatonota dregii. It is the only genus and species in the tribe Pomatonotini within the subfamily Mecopodinae. Pomatonota dregii is found in southern Africa.

References

Mecopodinae
Orthoptera of Africa